"Happy Birthday Helen" is a song written by Greg Arnold and recorded by Australian folk-rock band Things of Stone and Wood. The song was released in November 1992 as the second single from the band's debut studio album The Yearning. "Happy Birthday Helen" peaked at number 9 on the ARIA Charts in February 1993.

Track listing

Charts

Weekly charts

Year-end charts

Certifications

References

1992 songs
1992 singles
Things of Stone and Wood songs
Songs written by Greg Arnold